Minister may refer to:

 Minister (Christianity), a Christian cleric
 Minister (Catholic Church)
 Minister (government), a member of government who heads a ministry (government department)
 Minister without portfolio, a member of government with the rank of a normal minister but who doesn't head a ministry
 Shadow minister, a member of a Shadow Cabinet of the opposition
 Minister (Austria)
 Minister (diplomacy), the rank of diplomat directly below ambassador
 Ministerialis, a member of a noble class in the Holy Roman Empire
 The Minister, a 2011 French-Belgian film directed by Pierre Schöller

See also
Ministry (disambiguation)
Minster (disambiguation)
Yes Minister